Earl Leslie "Lefty" Jones (June 11, 1919 – January 24, 1989) was a Major League Baseball pitcher who played for the St. Louis Browns in .

External links

1919 births
1989 deaths
St. Louis Browns players
Major League Baseball pitchers
Baseball players from California
Beaver Falls Bees players
Fresno Cardinals players
Gloversville-Johnstown Glovers players
Oakland Oaks (baseball) players
San Diego Padres (minor league) players
Springfield Browns players
Toledo Mud Hens players
Visalia Cubs players
Youngstown Browns players
Bisbee Bees players